Carlos Villapudua (born March 10, 1968) is an American politician who is currently serving in the California State Assembly. A Democrat, he represents the 13th Assembly District, which encompasses western San Joaquin County, including the city of Stockton.  He received 83,746 votes in the 2020 election, with fellow Democrat Kathy Miller receiving 78,609 votes.

Villapudua was born in Stockton, California. and received a Bachelor of Arts in Social Services from the  California State University at Sacramento in 1997. Prior to being elected to the Assembly in 2020, he was a member of the San Joaquin County Board of Supervisors.  In 2016, Villapudua ran for Mayor of Stockton, but was defeated in the primary by Michael Tubbs, who went on to win the general election.

Election results

2020

2022

References

1968 births
Hispanic and Latino American state legislators in California
Democratic Party members of the California State Assembly
Living people
21st-century American politicians
Politicians from Stockton, California
County supervisors in California